Paddy (Patrick) McKillen (born 1955; Belfast, Northern Ireland) is an international hotelier, property investor and businessman.

Biography 
Born in Andersonstown, West Belfast, his father owned a garage in the same suburb. Aged 16 McKillen joined and built up the family business, which became one of the first garage chains in Northern Ireland, sold in the 1990's for €25m.

During the 1980s McKillen built up a portfolio of assets including commercial buildings, retail stores and shopping centres in Dublin, Belfast, Cork and Limerick. He was the main shareholder of the Jervis Shopping Centre (which was a hospital that he turned into a shopping mall), and a key investor in Clarendon Properties.

In the 1990s, he turned his attention to building an international property business. He focused on buying properties with significant unrealized potential in key locations, improving them and managing and holding the assets for the long-term. His portfolio gathered hotels, retail and commercial properties in Europe, the US, Asia and South America.

Irish investor Derek Quinlan bought the Savoy Hotel Group with other investors, including McKillen, in 2004. Shortly afterwards the group sold the Savoy Hotel and changed the name to the Maybourne Hotel Group which includes three of the finest hotels in the world – Claridges, The Connaught and The Berkeley. McKillen closed The Connaught in 2006 for a total redevelopment including new basements and penthouses. He personally chose designers and artists to work with him including Damien Hirst, David Collins, India Mahdavi and Tadao Ando who developed the famous water feature at the front. The Connaught was re-opened in 2008 and is regarded as one of the finest restorations of any luxury hotel in the world. It has since performed with one of the highest revenue levels amongst its peers in the international super-luxury hotel category.

Since 2007, Paddy McKillen was part of a consortium to develop the U2 Tower (planned storied building in Ireland). The progress of the project came to a halt a few years after the credit burst of 2008. The U2 Tower plans were eventually abandoned. In January 2019, a new project was approved on the docks where the tower would have been erected, a U2 Visitor Center, with McKillen among the promoters of the project. McKillen is a long-time friend of U2's singer Bono.

In 2015, the Qatari royal family (through Constellation Hotels, subsidiary of Qatar Holding) bought McKillen's Maybourne group for an undisclosed amount believed to be around £1.4 billion. McKillen retains a substantial financial interest in the hotels. Since 2015 he has initiated major renovation works to both The Berkeley Hotel and Claridges. McKillen has hired Lord Richard Rogers to design Maybourne’s fourth hotel in Knightsbridge, overlooking Hyde Park, which will be completed in 2020.

In 2016, through his estate development company Clarendon Properties, he won the project to redevelop Cork's waterfront. Clarendon was also bought Cork's Wilton Shopping Centre development project from NAMA in 2016.

He was nominated by both the British and Irish Governments’ as a Director of International Fund for Ireland to promote Peace and Reconciliation.

McKillen was appointed by the Irish Government to the Construction Industry Development Board (CIDB) founded to help improve Ireland’s property crisis.

In July 2022 McKillen was recognised by Ulster University as an honorary graduate for his “inspirational career in property development and hospitality, together with his role in promoting peace and reconciliation across Ireland”

Legal Disputes/Defending Hostile Take-Over Attempts

NAMA 

McKillen launched his first major legal action to stop NAMA when it attempted to seize his loans and assets during Ireland’s banking crisis. In February 2011 he won a landmark Supreme Court Case in Ireland and blocked NAMA from seizing some €3 billion of loans associated with companies he had a shareholding in. McKillen lined up Nobel Prize winning economist Professor Joseph Stigliz as an expert witness in the case which was unusually heard before all seven Irish Supreme Court judges. Professor Stiglitz stated that McKillen’s international portfolio of prime property assets was run to pension fund standards and that his profitable and fully performing loans, were exactly what the Irish economy needed to recover and stimulate growth and jobs, and that it would be detrimental to Mr McKillen’s businesses and the Irish economy to transfer them to NAMA. 

The seven Irish Supreme Court judges unanimously ruled in McKillen’s favour essentially because the decision to acquire the loans was made before NAMA had been formally established. They also found that McKillen has a right to be heard before acquisition of his loans. McKillen’s Supreme Court victory marked the beginning of a series of high profile international legal battles taken to protect his businesses from corporate raids that came about because of Ireland’s banking crisis. His Irish Supreme Court case Dellway vs NAMA is recognised as a landmark legal decision and is used internationally as an example of how Governments cannot override citizens’ rights during national emergencies.

Barclay Brothers 

The British Barclay Brothers launched a hostile takeover attempt on the Maybourne Hotel group in January 2011. McKillen fought back and spent over £50 million in legal fees on one of the largest commercial legal actions taken in London Courts to prevent the brothers from seizing the hotels. The battle caught the attention of world media as McKillen fought to protect his business. In 2015, the Barclay Brothers accepted defeat and sold their entire shareholding in the hotels to the Qataris.

Qatari Royal Family 

McKillen then sold his shares to the Qataris but retained a substantial stake in the hotels. He ran the hotels and carried out a major redevelopment of Claridges and the expansion of hotel group to include Maybourne Riviera in France and Maybourne Beverly Hills. In April 2022, the Qataris removed McKillen from the board of Maybourne Hotels as they argued over his stake in the business which could be worth more than €1.2 billion to McKillen .

Properties

Chateau La Coste/Villa La Coste 

Paddy McKillen owns and has been developing Chateau La Coste, a biodynamic vineyard and international destination for art, architecture and natural beauty in Provence, for the past 15 years. It was named by Newsweek as one of the Top 100 Destinations to ‘Visit in the World’. In 2017 McKillen opened a luxury hotel, Villa La Coste, on the 600-acre estate.

In November 2022, Tablet Hotels at the Michelin Guide featured Chateau La Coste with the headline, “A lot of people love art. Few people love it, or can afford to love it, as much as Patrick McKillen, who turned an old French vineyard into a striking hotel with a collection of art and architecture to rival the world’s best.”

Other properties 

In June 2015, Calvin Klein bought a house redeveloped by McKillen's son Dean, on the Hollywood Hills of Los Angeles for $25 million (purchased $6 million in 2012 and extensively refurbished by Dean at a cost of $12,000,000).

McKillen is continuing to expand his global business. In 2021 he opened Shinmonzen, A Tadao Ando designed Japanese Inn which he developed in Gion, Kyoto.

Personal life 

Paddy McKillen is married to his wife Maura. They have four children together and live in Los Angeles and France.

His son, Paddy McKillen Junior, is the owner of Press Up Entertainment.

References

1955 births
Living people
Businesspeople from Belfast
Irish businesspeople in real estate